Stephan Retzer (born October 11, 1976) is a German professional ice hockey defenceman. He is currently playing for ERC Ingolstadt in the Deutsche Eishockey Liga (DEL).

Career statistics

Regular season and playoffs

International

References

External links

1976 births
Living people
Adler Mannheim players
ERC Ingolstadt players
EV Landshut players
German ice hockey defencemen
Hamburg Freezers players
Kassel Huskies players